Matveyevsky District is an administrative and municipal district (raion), one of the thirty-five in Orenburg Oblast, Russia. It is located in the northwest of the oblast. Its administrative center is the rural locality (a selo) of Matveyevka. Population: 12,267 (2010 Census);  The population of Matveyevka accounts for 24.8% of the district's total population.

References

Notes

Sources

Districts of Orenburg Oblast
States and territories established in 1935